Luís Carlos Fernandes (born 25 July 1985), commonly known as Luizinho, is a Brazilian retired footballer who played as a forward.

Career
He spent his career playing mainly in Asia from 2007 to 2015. On 2 March 2011, Luizinho joined the South Korean club Incheon United, where he signed a contract until 2013.
 But, his contract was terminated after four months.

He played domestically for Santos, Portuguesa, Taubaté, Ipatinga, Santo André São José-RS and Itumbiara EC, in South Korea for Daegu FC, Ulsan Hyundai, Incheon United and Gwangju FC, for Kuwaiti club Al Arabi, and in Thailand for Suphanburi and Army United.

Honor
Individual
 Hauzen Cup 2007 Best scorer (9 App, 7 Goals)

References

External links

1985 births
Living people
Footballers from São Paulo (state)
Association football forwards
Brazilian footballers
Brazilian expatriate footballers
Campeonato Brasileiro Série A players
Campeonato Brasileiro Série C players
Santos FC players
Associação Portuguesa de Desportos players
Ipatinga Futebol Clube players
Esporte Clube Santo André players
Daegu FC players
Ulsan Hyundai FC players
Incheon United FC players
Gwangju FC players
K League 1 players
K League 2 players
Expatriate footballers in South Korea
Brazilian expatriate sportspeople in South Korea
Itumbiara Esporte Clube players
Clube Atlético Juventus players
Expatriate footballers in Thailand
People from Mogi Guaçu